William Watson (22 October 1864 – 21 December 1938) was an Australian businessman and politician. He was an independent member of the Australian House of Representatives for the seat of Fremantle as an independent from 1922 to 1928 and 1931 to 1934.

Watson was born in Campbells Creek, Victoria and was educated at Guildford State School. He left school at 13 and was variously a manual labourer, miner, navvy, bricklayer, plasterer, axeman, dairyman, farmer and commercial traveller before operating his own grocery shop in Melbourne from 1889 to 1895. 

Watson married Eliza Annie Showell on 2 April 1888 at Campbells Creek. They had ten children, with two sons dying in World War I and two daughters also predeceasing them.

In 1895, he moved to Western Australia and settled in Fremantle, where he opened the Watson Supply Stores. Watson's business began with a grocery store and tea room in Fremantle and another store in Perth, but expanded over decades to include a bacon factory and abattoir at Spearwood, butter and dairy factories and a large international export operation in bacon and ham. He also became known as a generous local benefactor, particularly towards returned soldiers after two of his sons were killed in World War I; he made a large donation towards the construction of the Fremantle War Memorial and was made an honorary member of the Fremantle branch of the Returned and Services League.

In 1922, he was elected to the Australian House of Representatives as an independent representing the seat of Fremantle. Watson was an outspoken opponent of the party system throughout his career, believing that it "prevented men giving their best service to the country and it made them decidedly dishonest, although they would rather it not be so"; however, politically he usually voted with the conservative parties in the House. He held the seat until he retired in 1928, citing his frustration with the political system and his inability to "mitigate the sectional division in parliament". He was re-elected to the House in 1931 - defeating John Curtin - citing his concern about the governmental response to the Great Depression for his decision to return to politics. However, he retired for a final time in 1934, stating that he had decided not to seek re-election unless it was proved to him that it "would be of some definite advantage to the people" if he were to be returned and this had not occurred.

Watson retired from the business in July 1937 and sold it to his three sons. He died at his home in Peppermint Grove in December 1938 and was buried in the Methodist section of Fremantle Cemetery.

Watson did not live to see Curtin become Prime Minister in 1941. Curtin was a pallbearer at Watson's funeral, describing him as a "generous and friendly opponent".

References

External links

Independent members of the Parliament of Australia
Members of the Australian House of Representatives for Fremantle
Members of the Australian House of Representatives
1864 births
1938 deaths
20th-century Australian politicians